Jean-Marie Cieleska (19 February 1928 – 5 May 1998) was a French racing cyclist. He rode in the 1951 Tour de France.

Major results
1951
 2nd Boucles de la Seine
1954
 2nd Boucles de la Seine
1955
 1st Paris–Camembert
 1st Paris–Bourges
 1st Circuit du Morbihan
 3rd Paris–Tours
 3rd Grand Prix d'Espéraza
1956
 1st Grand Prix d'Espéraza
 1st Paris–Valenciennes
 3rd Bordeaux–Paris
1958
 1st Bordeaux–Paris
1959
 1st Grand Prix d'Espéraza

References

1928 births
1998 deaths
French male cyclists